Sarah-Marie Belcastro (aka sarah-marie belcastro, born 1970 in San Diego) is an American mathematician and book author. She is an instructor at the  Art of Problem Solving Online School and is the director of Bryn Mawr's residential summer program MathILy. Although her doctoral research was in algebraic geometry, she has also worked extensively in topological graph theory. She is known for and has written extensively about mathematical knitting, and has co-edited three books on fiber mathematics. She herself exclusively uses the form "sarah-marie belcastro".

Biography
Belcastro was born in San Diego, CA in 1970, and grew up mostly in Andover, MA, and in Dubuque, IA. She earned a B.S. (1991) in Mathematics and Astronomy from Haverford College, an M.S. (1993) from The University of Michigan, Ann Arbor, and a Ph.D. (1997) there for a thesis on “Picard Lattices of Families of K3 Surfaces” done with Igor Dolgachev.

Since 2012, she has also been an instructor at the Art of Problem Solving Online School.  Since 2013, she he been the director of Bryn Mawr's residential summer program MathILy (serious Mathematics Infused with Levity).  She is also a guest faculty member at Sarah Lawrence College.

She was Associate Editor for The College Mathematics Journal (2003—2019).  She has also lectured frequently at the University of Massachusetts, Amherst since 2012.

Selected publications

Books
 Discrete Mathematics with Ducks (AK Peters, 2012; 2nd ed., CRC Press, 2019).
 Figuring Fibers, edited by belcastro and Carolyn Yackel, Providence, RI: American Mathematics Society, 2018.
 Crafting by Concepts: fiber arts and mathematics, edited by belcastro and Yackel. AK Peters, 2011.
 Making Mathematics with Needlework: Ten Papers and Ten Projects, edited by belcastro and Yackel. Wellesley, MA: AK Peters, 2007.

Journal papers

References

External links
 Official home page
 

American women mathematicians
Haverford College alumni
University of Michigan alumni
Geometric topology
Algebraists
Mathematics and art
Textile artists
Knitting
1970 births
Living people